Oyetunde is Yoruba given name and surname. Notable people with the surname include:

Given name
 Mudasiru Oyetunde Hussein, Nigerian politician and member of the Nigerian House of Representatives (1999-2007)  

Surname
 Adenike Oyetunde, media personality

Yoruba-language surnames